The Zaghawa or Beria script, Beria Giray Erfe ('Zaghawa Writing Marks'), is an indigenous alphabetic script proposed for the Zaghawa language (also known as Beria) of Darfur and Chad.

In the 1950s, a Sudanese Zaghawa schoolteacher named Adam Tajir created an alphabet for the Zaghawa language, sometimes known as the camel alphabet, deriving its glyphs from the clan brands used for camels and other livestock.  He copied the inventory of the Arabic script, so the system was not ideal for Zaghawa.

In 2000, a Zaghawa veterinarian named Siddick Adam Issa adapted Tajir's script to a form which has proven popular in the Zaghawa community. The typography is somewhat innovative in that capital letters have descenders which drop below the baseline of the lower-case letters and punctuation, contrasting with the capital letters which rise above most lower-case letters in the Latin alphabet. Beria Giray Erfe is a full alphabet, with independent letters for vowels; however, diacritics are used to mark tone (grave accent for falling tone and acute accent for rising tone; high, mid, and low tone are unmarked), as well as advanced tongue root vowels (a macron derives  from the letters for ).

European numerals and punctuation are used.

External links
SIL Zaghawa Beria Font page, with free non-Unicode font and 2007 Unicode proposal. 
Preliminary proposal to encode Beria Giray Erfe in Unicode (2008)

Saharan languages
Alphabets
Writing systems of Africa
Writing systems introduced in 1950